Queimada Nova is a municipality in the state of Piauí in the Northeast region of Brazil.

The municipality was designated a priority area for conservation and sustainable use when the Caatinga Ecological Corridor was created in 2006.

See also
List of municipalities in Piauí

References

Municipalities in Piauí